Urban Renewal is an album by the American band Funk, Inc., released in 1995. Two of Funk Inc.'s original bandmembers played on the album.

Critical reception

The Omaha World-Herald thought that the band "finds a strong groove but not much more on this James Brown-tinged jazz."

AllMusic wrote that the album "effectively combines the immediacy of soul and funk with the spontaneity of jazz."

Track listing

References

1995 albums
Funk, Inc. albums
Albums recorded at Van Gelder Studio
Prestige Records albums
Albums produced by Bob Porter (record producer)